Alyssa Anne George (born 1985) is a pageant competitor from Minneapolis, Kansas who competed in the Miss America pageant in 2008.

George won the Miss Kansas 2007 title in a state pageant held in Pratt on June 10, 2007.  She competed as Miss Sedgewick County, a local title she won in September 2006.  She also won the swimsuit competition, the Instrumentalist Award and the Kansas State Ambassador Award.

George had previously competed at Miss Kansas 2004 and 2005. She did not win in either year, but did win a preliminary swimsuit award in 2004.  George also competed at Miss Kansas USA 2006, where she made the top fifteen.

During the remainder of the year 2007 she toured throughout the state of Kansas to talk about her platform "Bullying: The Bystander Effect."  She also competed in the Miss America 2008 contest in Las Vegas.

George graduated from Minneapolis High School and studied at the University of Kansas.

References

External links 
 Miss Kansas official website
 Lawrence Journal World article with photo

1985 births
Living people
People from Minneapolis, Kansas
Miss America 2008 delegates
University of Kansas alumni